Communism is a political ideology and movement with the ultimate aim of achieving a communist society.

Communism may also refer to:
Anarcho-communism (also referred to as anarchist communism, communist anarchism, free communism, and libertarian communism), a far-left political ideology that believes in a society of no currency, no hierarchies, and no private property
Communism Peak, a mountain in Tajikistan
Communist society (or communist system), a hypothetical socioeconomic system characterized by superabundance, the holding of property in common and free access; most notable in Marxist theory where it is postulated to arise after socialism and based on the principle of from each according to his ability, to each according to his needs
Communist state, a term used by Western historians to describe a dominant or single-party sovereign socialist state in which the ruling party officially adheres to a variant of Marxism-Leninism or its variations (e.g. Leninism, Maoism, etc.)
Marxism–Leninism, a political ideology that combines elements of Marxism with the Leninist practices of Vanguardism, democratic centralism and theory of imperialism which serves as the ideology of Communist states
Primitive communism (or communalism), a name for early hunter-gatherer societies that had no hierarchical social class structures or capital accumulation
War communism, the economic policy in Soviet Russia during 1918–1921
 Socialism, often confused with communism

See also
Kommunist, Soviet magazine
Kommunizm, a village in Tajikistan
Kommunizm (band), a Russian avant-garde music group